Route 26 is a bus route operated by the Maryland Transit Administration in Baltimore and its suburbs. The line currently runs from Downtown Fayette & Charles Street east through downtown Baltimore to Dundalk Marine Terminal. The main roads on which the line operates are Baltimore Street, Fayette Street, and Broening Highway. The line serves the communities of Highlantown, Baltimore Travel Plaza,
The bus route is the successor to the 20 Dundalk Marine Terminal/CCBC Dundalk.

History 
On 22 February 2015, the #20 Line service was cut to run between Security Square Mall and City Hall, with short turns at Edmonsdon Village as part of the first phase implementation of the Bus Network Improvement Project.  Service on the eastern portion of the route was picked up by the new Route 31 for trips to Dundalk and by new Route 26 with expanded service to Dundalk Marine Terminal and the Amazon Warehouse

See also 
 Route 30 (supplemental service)
 Route 20 (Local Bus service)

References 

Maryland Transit Administration bus routes
Transportation at Johns Hopkins Hospital
2015 establishments in Maryland